The Slovene Covenant (Slovenska zaveza) was an underground anti-communist organisation formed in Slovenia in April 1942 by a number of non-communist political parties after the killing of Avgust Praprotnik (1891–1942) by operatives from the Security and Intelligence Service (Varnostnoobveščevalna služba, VOS), a forerunner of the Yugoslav secret police. It "adopted a political programme that strongly echoed the political positions of the OF" (Osvobodilna fronta). In 1943 anti-communist forces including the Slovene Covenant engaged in armed conflict against Partisan forces in the country and were defeated.

See also
Miha Krek,  Slovenian lawyer
Marko Natlačen, Slovenian politician and jurist
Leon Rupnik, Slovene general and Nazi collaborator
Liberalism in Slovenia
Slovenes, Slovenian people
Slovene Partisans, part of Europe's most effective anti-Nazi resistance movement
Slovene Lands in World War II

References

Further reading
Leopoldina Plut-Pregelj, Carole Rogel. The A to Z of Slovenia. Rowman & Littlefield (2010) 

Slovenia in World War II
Anti-communist organizations